Pintuyan, officially the Municipality of Pintuyan, is a 5th class municipality in the province of Southern Leyte, Philippines and was established in 1865. During the American regime, the seat of Pintuyan was moved to Pintuyan from San Ricardo upon the election of Perfecto Vazquez as Municipal President. From then on the residents of barrio San Ricardo petitioned for a separate municipality. According to the 2020 census, it has a population of 10,202 people.

Geography

Barangays
Pintuyan is politically subdivided into a total of 23 barangays which are:

Climate

Demographics

Economy

References

External links

 Pintuyan Profile at PhilAtlas.com
 [ Philippine Standard Geographic Code]
Philippine Census Information
Local Governance Performance Management System

Municipalities of Southern Leyte